Avan Tudor Jogia (born February 9, 1992) is a Canadian actor. He first received recognition for portraying Danny Araujo in the television film A Girl Like Me: The Gwen Araujo Story (2006). After moving to the United States in his late teens, he landed various television roles within series such as Caprica (2009–2010).

Jogia had his breakthrough for playing Beck Oliver in the Nickelodeon sitcom Victorious (2010–2013), and rose to mainstream prominence for his roles as Danny Desai in the drama series Twisted (2013), Tutankhamun in the miniseries Tut (2015), Roman Mercer in the paranormal action series Ghost Wars (2017–2018) and Ulysses Zane in the comedy series Now Apocalypse (2019). Numerous credits in television and cinema include Spectacular! (2009), Finding Hope Now (2010), Rags (2012), Ten Thousand Saints (2015), I Am Michael (2015) and Zombieland: Double Tap (2019). His directorial debut came in 2011 with the short film Alex. He stars as Leon S. Kennedy in the 2021 film Resident Evil: Welcome to Raccoon City.

In 2011, Jogia co-founded the LGBT online organization Straight But Not Narrow, which seeks to shape the viewpoints of teenagers and adults on matters pertaining to the LGBT community. In 2019, he published his first book, Mixed Feelings, a series of short stories and poems about multiracial identity. He and his brother Ketan make up the band Saint Ivory. They released an album to complement the book also titled Mixed Feelings.

Early life 
Avan Tudor Jogia was born on February 9, 1992, in Vancouver, British Columbia, the son of Wendy and Mike Jogia. His father is a British Indian Gujarati, and his mother is of English, German, and Welsh descent. He is the younger brother of Ketan, a music producer in London.

Besides English, Jogia speaks some Gujarati and French.

According to The Start, Jogia was a student at Killarney Secondary School until age 17 when he left to pursue acting full-time, having already gained a number of small television credits. In an interview, he said that his parents withdrew him from middle school in favor of home schooling. He moved to Los Angeles, California on the trial-basis ultimatum that he would land a role within a six-month period – or return to schooling.

Jogia has cited British actor Tim Curry as one of his early acting inspirations, particularly Curry's role as Long John Silver in the 1996 musical adventure comedy film, Muppet Treasure Island. British actor Sir Ben Kingsley is another of Jogia's inspirations; the two would later appear in the 2015 miniseries Tut, and work together on the 2016 short film Of Dogs and Men.

Career

2006–2013: Caprica and Victorious 

His first role came in 2006 when he portrayed Danny Araujo–the younger brother of teenage transgender woman Gwen Araujo–in the biographical television film A Girl Like Me: The Gwen Araujo Story, directed by Agnieszka Holland. In 2007, he had a recurring role in The CW television sitcom Aliens in America as the character Sam, and appeared in the Canadian horror television movie Devil's Diary. He next appeared in the 2008 Nickelodeon network original film Gym Teacher: The Movie, as Champ Sinclair, a role opposite Law & Order: Special Victims Unit actor Christopher Meloni. He returned to the network the following year, starring in the 2009 film Spectacular! as Tajid, alongside future Victorious co-star Victoria Justice.

From 2009 to 2010, Jogia had a recurring role in the television series Caprica, a spin-off of Battlestar Galactica, on Syfy. Cast as the role of Ben Stark in August 2008, with production of the series' pilot episode completed by the conclusion of that year. In late 2009, he joined the cast of Nickelodeon television series Victorious. Starring alongside Victoria Justice, Ariana Grande, and Elizabeth Gillies, Jogia played Beck Oliver, the boyfriend of Jade West (played by Gillies). This was the actor's first main role in a television series; a role, which lasted from the series' inception in March 2010, through to the conclusion of the 4th and final season of the show in 2013. Jogia sang background vocals on several cast songs in the show's soundtrack, and had a brief prominent part in the song "Finally Falling" in the episode "Tori the Zombie". Jogia also appeared as Beck in the Nickelodeon film, iParty with Victorious, a Victorious crossover movie with iCarly.

Throughout his tenure on Victorious, Jogia starred in various films. In 2010, he appeared in the drama film Triple Dog, and the gang-crime film Finding Hope Now (filmed back in 2009) as the lead character, Santos Delgado. Jogia later directed and starred in Alex, a short film; this marked his first project he directed. During the following year, he appeared in the 2012 Nickelodeon television movie Rags, along with Keke Palmer and Drake Bell, portraying Finn Covington.

2013–2016: Twisted, Tut and other projects 
Jogia was cast in the lead role of Danny Desai on the ABC Family mystery–thriller series Twisted (originally titled Socio), in October 2012. The role saw Jogia opposite main cast members Maddie Hasson and Kylie Bunbury, and supporting cast members including Denise Richards, Sam Robards and Kimberly Quinn. The series pilot was greenlit in August 2012, and was filmed in October in New York City. In February 2013, ABC Family ordered the show as a series and production commenced in Studio City the following month, on April 3, 2013. On the themes of the series, Jogia remarked, "Twisted is similar to Pretty Little Liars in that it's about trying to find out who did it, but it's more about the human relationships between characters and the strain that things can put on them. It's also a little bit of a social commentary piece, because it covers very timely issues." The series premiered on June 11, 2013, and ran for 19 episodes; for his role as Desai, Jogia received two nominations at the 2013 and 2014 Teen Choice Awards, in the categories "Summer TV Star: Male" and "Actor: Drama", respectively. ABC Family opted not to renew Twisted for a second season, in August 2014.

In 2014, Jogia was cast in the Spike TV miniseries, Tut, alongside English actor Sir Ben Kingsley. In the lead role of the titular Pharaoh Tutankhamun, Jogia was reunited with Twisted actress Kylie Bunbury, who portrayed Suhad –Tutankhamun's love interest. On the casting of Bunbury, Jogia noted that, "[i]t was cool to be able to work with someone [Bunbury] you have built-in chemistry with. Going into this situation, I had no idea what it was going to be like, so knowing I was taking this on with someone I knew really helped." The miniseries, filmed in Morocco, premiered on Spike on July 19, 2015, and concluded on July 21, 2015.

Jogia returned to cinema after joining the cast of multiple films throughout 2014. In February of that year, Deadline reported that Jogia would star in Ten Thousand Saints, an adaption of the 2011 novel of the same name by Eleanor Henderson. Released in 2015, the film also starred Asa Butterfield, Hailee Steinfeld and Ethan Hawke. In August 2014, he landed a role in I Am Michael. Based on Benoit Denizet-Lewis' New York Times Magazine article "My Ex-Gay Friend" in 2011, the film's cast includes James Franco, Zachary Quinto and Emma Roberts, along with Jogia who portrays Nico, a gay Buddhist the protagonist (Franco) briefly falls in love with. Principal photography on the film commenced on August 11, 2014, in New York City and concluded later that month. The film was released at the 2015 Sundance Film Festival, before a limited release and through video on demand in January 2017. Later in 2015, Jogia appeared as Dark in the short film, Here Now. Further in 2015, he released a trailer for a horror–thriller short film he directed, entitled Of Dogs and Men. The short film had appearances by Sir Ben Kingsley, who previously worked with Jogia on Tut.

Jogia's next credit was the 1970s–based crime drama film Shangri–La Suite (also known as Killing the King), together with Luke Grimes and Emily Browning. The film follows two young lovers (Grimes and Browning) who go on a journey to Los Angeles with the intent of killing Elvis Presley; Jogia starred as Teijo Littlefoot, an old friend of the protagonist (Grimes), who joins the duo's journey in search of medical transition. The film was released in late 2016. He appeared as Bones, in the 2016 web series short Last Teenagers of the Apocalypse. The four-part series, which was released on April 21, 2016, was produced and directed by Jogia.

2017–present: Films, Now Apocalypse and Mixed Feelings 

In 2017, he starred in the psychological thriller The Drowning (previously, Border Crossing), directed by Bette Gordon, with Julia Stiles and Josh Charles. Adapted from Pat Barker's 2001 novel Border Crossing, Jogia portrayed the central character, Danny, who was rescued from drowning by the man (Charles) who aided his conviction for murder 12 years earlier. Jogia starred in the comedy film The Outcasts, alongside lead actress Victoria Justice. Later, Jogia appeared in The Year of Spectacular Men, a film directed by Lea Thompson. Thompson is the mother of Zoey Deutch, who also appears in the film opposite Jogia. He played Sebastian, the "loving boyfriend" of a movie star (Deutch), followed by a role in A Midsummer Night's Dream, a contemporary film adaption of the comedy of the same name written by William Shakespeare. Jogia starred in Syfy's 13-episode series titled Ghost Wars that premiered in 2017, and it was filmed in Vancouver, British Columbia, Canada, but it was canceled at the beginning of 2018.

Jogia also landed a co-lead role with Eve Hewson in Rebecca Addelman's directorial debut, Paper Year. Production on the project commenced in October 2016, and was released in 2018. He portrays Matt in the 2018 romantic comedy, The New Romantic, which stars Jessica Barden and Camila Mendes. That year, Jogia was also cast in the upcoming dramatic film The Artist's Wife, together with Bruce Dern and Lena Olin. The film is scheduled to premiere at the Hamptons International Film Festival in December 2019. In June 2018, Jogia was chosen to lead the Starz comedy series Now Apocalypse, alongside Kelli Berglund, Beau Mirchoff, and Roxane Mesquida. Jogia portrayed Ulysses Zane, who, along with his friends "are on various quests pursuing love, sex and fame while navigating the strange and oftentimes bewildering city of Los Angeles." The series, which marked Jogia's second project with writer and director Gregg Araki (after Here Now), aired in March 2019, and was later cancelled after one season. That same year, he appeared in the action comedy Shaft, and had a bigger role, as a laid-back musician, in the sequel Zombieland: Double Tap.

In September 2019, Jogia published a book, Mixed Feelings, on growing up with a mixed-race identity, and whether there is a correlation in the experiences of those of mixed race. The book comprises a series of personal stories and poems about Jogia's life. He noted, "there was a massive appetite for this conversation", and having reached out to his social media following, he "was able to sort of communicate with these people, interview with them, sort of to take parts of their stories [...] and mash them up within the book."

Personal life 
Jogia describes himself as "spiritual", having spent months as a Buddhist and has roots in Hinduism. Jogia maintains that he has "looked at all kinds of ways of being, because I'm curious about what it takes to be human." Jogia is also a dual citizen of Canada and the United Kingdom. Jogia has a number of tattoos; one on his chest, leg, upper leg, shoulder, back, and his lower arm. Jogia uses he/they pronouns.

Activism 
Jogia co-founded the online PSA organization Straight But Not Narrow (SBNN) in 2011, with Heather Wilk and Andre Pochon in conjunction with the support of fellow actor, Josh Hutcherson. The non-profit organization aims towards changing the attitudes and viewpoints of heterosexuals about the LGBTQIA+ community. Jogia believed that:
"[t]here was no one making straight youth responsible for their apathy. When you see a bully beating up a kid and you stand idle, that's as loud, or louder, than the actual oppression."
In 2019, during an interview with Attitude, Jogia stated he does not feel comfortable labeling his sexuality.

Filmography

Film

Television

Video games

Web

Director

Discography

Albums

with Saint Ivory

Singles

Awards and nominations

References

External links 

 
 
 

1992 births
Living people
21st-century Canadian male actors
21st-century Canadian male singers
Asian-Canadian filmmakers
Canadian Buddhists
Canadian expatriate male actors in the United States
Canadian Hindus
Canadian male actors of Indian descent
Canadian male child actors
Canadian male film actors
Canadian male singers
Canadian male television actors
Canadian male voice actors
Canadian people of English descent
Canadian people of German descent
Canadian people of Indian descent
Canadian people of Welsh descent
Canadian philanthropists
English people of Canadian descent
English people of German descent
English people of Indian descent
English people of Welsh descent
Film directors from Vancouver
Canadian LGBT rights activists
Male actors from Vancouver
Musicians from Vancouver